The Viet Cong was an armed revolutionary organization in South Vietnam. It may also refer to:
 Vietcong (video game), a 2003 tactical first-person shooter video game
 Preoccupations, a Canadian post-punk band formerly known as Viet Cong
 Tiến lên, a Vietnamese card game, sometimes known in the United States as "Viet Cong"